The Lincolnton Cardinals of Lincolnton, North Carolina, United States were a minor league baseball team. They began play when the Western Carolina League was formed in 1948.  They won the league's first title that season.  In 1953, they joined the Tar Heel League and played one season there.

Location: Lincolnton, NC
League: Western Carolina League 1948-1952; Tar Heel League 1953
Affiliation: none
Ballpark: Love Field

Year–by–year records

References

Defunct Western Carolinas League teams
Professional baseball teams in North Carolina
Defunct baseball teams in North Carolina
Baseball teams disestablished in 1953
Baseball teams established in 1948